Constance Cumbey (born February 29, 1944) is an American lawyer and activist Christian author.

Views 

Cumbey offered the first major criticism of the New Age movement from a Christian perspective in The Hidden Dangers of the Rainbow: The New Age Movement and Our Coming Age of Barbarism (1983), but quickly lost academic credibility due to her promotion of conspiracy theories linking the New Age movement to Benjamin Creme, theosophy and Nazism. Scholar of New Age religion James R. Lewis describes this book as containing "a few few insightful criticisms with many accusations of the least responsible sort", and that she is "simply lumping together anything that departs from a rather strict interpretation of Christianity." Cumbey's accusations include that the New Age movement has "infiltrated all of Christianity, as well as Judaism", and that it is the motivating force behind ecumenism, holistic health centers, New Thought, humanistic psychology, Montessori schools, modernism, secular humanism, and zero population growth. She states that Unitarian churches and health food stores become "New Age recruiting centers", that the Guardian Angels become one of the New Age movement's paramilitary organizations and that "the New Age Movement has complete identity with the programs of Hitler". Her contention is that the New Age movement is not simply expressing a naive or unscriptural interest in metaphysics, but that it is an organized conspiracy to overthrow the United States and replace it with a Nazi-like regime.

Cumbey is harshly critical of all religions other than Christianity and Judaism, and those who take an interest in them.

In the wake of the attacks following the release of The Innocence of Muslims she suggested on her blog that the incident might have been a deliberate attempt by New Agers to set their enemies against one each other.

I have my own suspicions that this is an incited thing that is designed to set the three Alice Bailey delineated fundamentalist target groups of Jews, Christians, and Moslems off against each other.  I have even uglier feelings that it was cynically produced and put in circulation with just that sort of "kill-off Monotheism" war... I suspect this may be a deliberate and well-financed move to incite the target groups against each other

Published work 
Is the Antichrist in the World Today? An Interview with Constance Cumbey. Oklahoma City: Southwest Radio Church, 1982
The New Age Movement: Age of Aquarius, Age of Antichrist. (featuring Emil Gaverluk and Noah Hutchings), Oklahoma City: Southwest Radio Church, 1982
The Hidden Dangers of the Rainbow: The New Age Movement and our Coming Age of Barbarism Shreveport, La.: Huntington House, 1983 
A Planned Deception: The Staging of a New Age Messiah East Detroit, Mich: Pointe Publishers, 1986

References

Further reading 
 Irving Hexham, "The Evangelical Response to the New Age," in Perspectives on the New Age, James R. Lewis and J. Gordon Melton, eds., (Albany: State University of New York Press, 1992), pp. 152–163.
 Bob and Gretchen Passantino, Witch Hunt (Nashville: Thomas Nelson, 1990).
 John A. Saliba, Christian Responses to the New Age Movement: A Critical Assessment (London: Geoffrey Chapman, 1999).
 SCP Staff, "The Final Threat: Cosmic Conspiracy and end times speculation," in The New Age Rage, Karen Hoyt and J. Isamu Yamamoto, eds., (Old Tappan: Revell, 1987), pp. 185–201.

External links 

What Constance thinks (blog)
Constance Cumbey interviewed by GeorgeAnn Hughes of "The Byte Show"

1944 births
Living people
People from Fort Wayne, Indiana
20th-century American lawyers
American religious writers
Women religious writers
People from Wayne County, Michigan
American conspiracy theorists
20th-century American women lawyers
Writers from Fort Wayne, Indiana
Christian conspiracy theorists
Baptists from Michigan
21st-century American women
20th-century American non-fiction writers
American women non-fiction writers
Writers from Michigan